Elections to Oldham Metropolitan Borough Council were held on 4 May 2006.  One third of the Council was up for election.

The Labour Party retained overall control of the Council.

After the election, the composition of the council was

Labour 31
Liberal Democrat 27
Conservative 1
Independent (politician) 1

Election result

Ward results

Alexandra ward

Chadderton Central ward

Chadderton North ward

Chadderton South ward

Coldhurst ward

Crompton ward

Failsworth East ward

Failsworth West ward

Hollinwood ward

Medlock Vale ward

Royton North ward

Royton South ward

Saddleworth North ward

Saddleworth South ward

Saddleworth West and Lees ward

St James ward

St Marys ward

Shaw ward

Waterhead ward

Werneth ward

References

2006
2006 English local elections